The 1998 British Rowing Championships known as the National Championships at the time, were the 27th edition of the National Championships, held from 17 to 19 July 1998 at the Strathclyde Country Park in Motherwell, North Lanarkshire. They were organised and sanctioned by British Rowing, and are open to British rowers.

Senior

Medal summary

Lightweight

Medal summary

U 23

Medal summary

Junior

Medal summary 

Key

References 

British Rowing Championships
British Rowing Championships
British Rowing Championships